Thomas George Karimpanal (born 13 July 1997) popularly known as Thommen is an Indian sports shooter.

Early life 
He was born in Kottayam, Kerala to George Kurian Karimpanal and Rekha George. He graduated from OP Jindal Global University School of International Affairs.

Career 
He is in Jr. National Shooting Squad since 2015.

References

Living people
Sport shooters from Kerala
Indian male sport shooters
Malayali people
1997 births